Cerro Capurata, also known as Elena Capurata or Quimsachatas is a stratovolcano in the Andes of Bolivia and Chile. To the south of Capurata lies Cerro Casparata and straight west Guallatiri.

Geography and geomorphology 

It is on the border of the Parinacota Province of Chile (Putre commune) and of the Bolivian province of Sajama (commune Turco). Compared to Acotango and Humurata, Capurata's rocks are relatively well preserved. Some hydrothermal alteration, partly associated with fumarolic activity, is present however. The volcano is formed by lava domes, lava flows and pyroclastic flows. Sulfur deposits formed by solfataras are also found on Capurata. The west side of the mountain is covered with snow and ice. Two crater depressions on the summit have an appearance that suggests a Holocene age.

Incan Ruins and First Ascent

A  ruin towards the northern site of the summit. The structure was probably built by the Inkas and it was photographed by Pedro Hauck during his last ascent in 2014. The first recorded climb is by Pedro Rosende and Ignacio Morlans (Chile) in 10/07/1967.

Elevation

See also

 Salla Qullu
 List of mountains in the Andes

Notes

References

External links
Elevation information about Capurata 
Weather Forecast at Capurata 

Capurata
Capurata
Capurata
Bolivia–Chile border
Capurata